The Niederelbe (i.e. Once passing the Hamburg state border, the Niederelbe also forms the border between the states of Lower Saxony and Schleswig-Holstein.

The Niederelbe forms part of the Elbe section named the Unterelbe (i. e. Lower ("Under") Elbe), comprising all parts of the Elbe influenced by the North Sea's tides, starting further inland at the sluice in Geesthacht (or Elbe kilometer 586).

See also
List of rivers of Hamburg
List of rivers of Lower Saxony
List of rivers of Schleswig-Holstein

External links 

Elbe
Rivers of Hamburg
Rivers of Lower Saxony
Rivers of Schleswig-Holstein
 
Rivers of Germany